The 2017–18 season is Wydad AC's 78th season in their existence and the club's 62nd consecutive season in the top flight of Moroccan football. They have competed in the Botola, the 2017 CAF Champions League, the 2018 CAF Champions League and the Throne Cup.

Squad list
Players and squad numbers last updated on 10 September 2017.Note: Flags indicate national team as has been defined under FIFA eligibility rules. Players may hold more than one non-FIFA nationality.

Competitions

Overview

{| class="wikitable" style="text-align: center"
|-
!rowspan=2|Competition
!colspan=8|Record
!rowspan=2|Started round
!rowspan=2|Final position / round
!rowspan=2|First match
!rowspan=2|Last match
|-
!
!
!
!
!
!
!
!
|-
| Botola Pro

| 
| style="background:silver;"| Runners–up
| 10 September 2017
| 20 May 2018
|-
| Throne Cup

| Round of 32
| Round of 16
| 23 August 2017
| 12 October 2017
|-
| 2017 Champions League

| Group stage
| style="background:gold;"| Winners
| 17 September 2017
| 4 November 2017
|-
| FIFA Club World Cup

| Second round
| Fifth place
| 9 December 2017
| 12 December 2017
|-
| CAF Super Cup

| Final
| style="background:gold;"| Winners
| colspan=2| 24 February 2018
|-
| 2018 Champions League

| First round
| Group stage
| 7 March 2018
| 15 May 2018
|-
! Total

Botola Pro

League table

Results summary

Results by round

Matches

Moroccan Throne Cup

2017 CAF Champions League

knockout stage

Quarter-finals

Semi-finals

Final

FIFA Club World Cup

CAF Super Cup

2018 CAF Champions League

First round

Group stage

Group C

Squad information

Playing statistics

|-
! colspan=14 style=background:#dcdcdc; text-align:center| Goalkeepers

|-
! colspan=14 style=background:#dcdcdc; text-align:center| Defenders

|-
! colspan=14 style=background:#dcdcdc; text-align:center| Midfielders

|-
! colspan=14 style=background:#dcdcdc; text-align:center| Forwards

|-
! colspan=14 style=background:#dcdcdc; text-align:center| Players transferred out during the season

Goalscorers
Includes all competitive matches. The list is sorted alphabetically by surname when total goals are equal.

Transfers

In

Out

References

Wydad AC seasons
Wydad Casablanca
Wydad